This is a list of the 200 members of the Swiss National Council for the term 2003–2007.

The elections were held on October 19, 2003 and the first session opened on December 1, 2003. The final autumn session was held September 17 - October 5, 2007 and the elections for the next term on October 21, 2007.

For the abbreviations, see Political parties of Switzerland

See also
 List of members of the Swiss National Council (2007-2011)
 Presidents of the National Council of Switzerland
 List of members of the Swiss Council of States

2003